d・file -for tv programs- , is the thirteenth solo album from Japanese musician Daisuke Asakura released on July 19, 2006. According to the title, each track on the album was used in a Japanese television program, but it has never been specified by Asakura in exactly which television programs the tracks were used.

Track listing

All songs produced, composed and arranged by Daisuke Asakura.

References
 Official Daisuke Asakura Profile
 Daisuke Asakura Discography on Sony Music Japan

Daisuke Asakura albums
2006 EPs